Missing Allen is a documentary concerning the disappearance and death of the filmmaker Allen Ross, The documentary has been nominated for the Adolf Grimme Award, Best Documentary Award] at the European Film Awards and the German Camera Award for Outstanding Editing. It received a Certificate of Merit at the San Francisco International Film Festival and was named best documentary at Montreal's Festival du Nouveau Cinéma and the Venice International Television Festival.

References

External links
 

 

German documentary films
Biographical documentary films
2002 films
American documentary films
2000s German-language films
2002 documentary films
2000s English-language films
2000s American films
2000s German films